Bad Kitty is a fictional character that appears in comic books published by Chaos! Comics. Bad Kitty was one of several staple Chaos characters that capitalized on the so-called bad girl genre.

Fictional character biography
New Orleans law enforcer Catherine Bell was one of a rare breed - a truly honest cop. Eventually the inevitable happened, when what should have been a routine case brought her into conflict with the corruption within her own police force. It also confronted her with the realities of voodoo, when her lover was transformed into a zombie, and sent to kill her. 

Enraged, Catherine gave up the force and using a lot of high calibre weapons expressed her disapproval of those responsible for wrecking her life. They ended up dead, and she ended up on the FBI Most Wanted list. Now using the alias Bad Kitty, and accompanied by her black cat, Lucky, she continues to confront the supernatural, and tries to survive.

Legacy
Bad Kitty, as well as all other titles published by Chaos Comics, ended when Chaos declared bankruptcy in 2002. All of the Chaos properties, with the exception of Lady Death, were later bought by Tales of Wonder.

As of 2010, Dynamite Entertainment owns the rights to most of the Chaos Comics characters including Bad Kitty. Dynamite Entertainment relaunched Bad Kitty in October 2010 with a new one-shot written by J.C. Spence and illustrated by Rafael Carlos.

Series
 Bad Kitty
 Bad Kitty: Reloaded
 Lady Death/Bad Kitty/Chastity: United (one shot)
 Bad Kitty: Mischief Night
 Lady Death/Bad Kitty (one shot)
Chaos!Bad Kitty(One-shot)(2014)
Red Sonja:Age of Chaos 1-6

References

External links
Bad Kitty at Don Markstein's Toonopedia. Archived from the original on February 22, 2018.

Chaos! Comics titles
Chaos! Comics characters